Kurt Mollekens (born 8 March 1973 in Bonheiden) is a Belgian race car driver and team owner.

Mollekens debuted as a driver in top-level karting during 1990, staying there until 1992 when he moved up to Formula Ford. His debut Formula Ford year was successful, him winning all three titles he challenged for – Benelux Formula Ford, Dutch Formula Ford and Belgian Formula Ford.

Mollekens also achieved success in the 1993 British Formula Ford season, which helped him into Formula Opel Euroseries (1994) and the British Formula 3 Championship (1995). He stayed in the latter during 1996, at which time he won the international Formula Three race at Zandvoort, his biggest win. Mollekens joined Formula 3000 in 1997 and spent two years there with the Keerbergs Transport Racing (KTR) team, which he owned. In 1999 he continued to run the team without driving, instead driving for Peugeot in the Belgian Pro Car Series.

He continued as an F3000 team owner until 2001, and after a hiatus as a driver in 2000, returned as a competitor in some races of the FIA GT Championship of 2001 and 2002. In 2002 his team left Formula 3000, moving to the lesser-known World Series by Nissan, and latterly, World Series by Renault, in which the team competed until 2008. After a hiatus KTR planned to return to racing in 2009 in the Eurocup Formula Renault 2.0. In 2004, Mollekens continued as a driver in part of the European Touring Car Championship.

References

External links

1973 births
Living people
People from Bonheiden
Belgian racing drivers
Formula Ford drivers
Formula Renault Eurocup teams
British Formula Three Championship drivers
European Touring Car Championship drivers
World Series Formula V8 3.5 teams
International Formula 3000 drivers
EFDA Nations Cup drivers
European Le Mans Series drivers
24 Hours of Spa drivers
Arden International drivers
Sportspeople from Antwerp Province
Motorsport team owners
BMW M drivers
Racing Bart Mampaey drivers
KTR drivers
Larbre Compétition drivers
Alan Docking Racing drivers
W Racing Team drivers
Boutsen Ginion Racing drivers